Adelophryne adiastola (common names: Yapima Shield frog, Yapima little hammer frog) is a species of frogs in the family Eleutherodactylidae. It is found in the Amazon Basin in Colombia (Amazonas and Vaupés Departments), Ecuador (Pastaza Province), Peru, and western Brazil.

Description
Adelophryne adiastola are tiny frogs: based on the type series consisting of three males and a female, males measure  and the female  in snout–vent length. The head is longer than it is wide, and slightly wider than the body. Dorsal skin is shagreened to granular. The snout is rounded. The tympanum is small but distinct. The fingers and toes are depressed. Finger tips have no discs but have asymmetrically pointed tips. The toes have circumferentially grooved, asymmetrically pointed discs. There is neither webbing nor lateral fringes. Adult males have a large, subgular vocal sac.

Habitat and conservation
The female paratype had ingested a small harvestman of the family Sironidae.

The species is common in Colombia. It is locally impacted by habitat loss, but its range is in an area of generally low human impact.

References

adiastola
Amphibians of Brazil
Amphibians of Colombia
Amphibians of Ecuador
Amphibians of Peru
Amphibians described in 1984
Taxonomy articles created by Polbot
Taxa named by Marinus Steven Hoogmoed